Vombsjön (sometimes called Våmbsjön) is a lake in Scania, Sweden. It is located 20 km to the east of Lund and lies in the municipalities of Lund, Eslöv and Sjöbo. The lake has been the source of drinking water for Malmö since 1948. Its watershed is 447 km2.

References

Scania
Lakes of Skåne County